Werner Maximilian Friedrich Zoege von Manteuffel (13 July 1857, in Määri, Estonia – 14 March 1926, in Tallinn, Estonia) was a Baltic German medical surgeon. He was the earliest advocate of sterilised gloves.

He studied at the University of Dorpat (Tartu) and became a doctor in 1886.

He published an article in 1897 recommending surgeons use rubber gloves and boil them in water before wearing them. At the time most doctors operated with their bare hands, or wore gloves of cotton, leather, or other absorbent materials.

References

External links
Biography
Commemorative postcard

1857 births
1926 deaths
Estonian surgeons
Baltic-German people